The brown bear (Ursus arctos) is a large bear species found across Eurasia and North America. In North America, the populations of brown bears are called grizzly bears, while the subspecies that inhabits the Kodiak Islands of Alaska is known as the Kodiak bear. It is one of the largest living terrestrial members of the order Carnivora, rivaled in size only by its closest relative, the polar bear (Ursus maritimus), which is much less variable in size and slightly bigger on average. The brown bear's range includes parts of Russia, Central Asia, the Himalayas, China, Canada, the United States, Hokkaido, Scandinavia, Finland, the Balkans, the Picos de Europa and the Carpathian region (especially Romania), Iran, Anatolia, and the Caucasus. The brown bear is recognized as a national and state animal in several European countries.

While the brown bear's range has shrunk, and it has faced local extinctions across its wide range, it remains listed as a least concern species by the International Union for Conservation of Nature (IUCN) with a total estimated  population in 2017 of 110,000. , this and the American black bear are the only bear species not classified as threatened by the IUCN, though the large sizes of both bears may be a disadvantage due to increased competition with humans. Populations that were hunted to extinction in the 19th and 20th centuries are the Atlas bear of North Africa and the Californian, Ungavan and Mexican populations of the grizzly bear of North America. Many of the populations in the southern parts of Eurasia are highly endangered as well. One of the smaller-bodied forms, the Himalayan brown bear, is critically endangered, occupying only 2% of its former range and threatened by uncontrolled poaching for its body parts. The Marsican brown bear of central Italy is one of several currently isolated populations of the Eurasian brown bear and is believed to have a population of just 50 to 60 bears.

Evolution and taxonomy
In the mid-19th century United States, the brown bear was termed "Old Ephraim" and sometimes as "Moccasin Joe".

Generalized names and evolution
Brown bears are thought to have evolved from Ursus etruscus in Asia. The brown bear, per Kurten (1976), has been stated as "clearly derived from the Asian population of Ursus savini about 800,000 years ago; spread into Europe, to the New World." A genetic analysis indicated that the brown bear lineage diverged from the cave bear species complex approximately 1.2–1.4 million years ago, but did not clarify if U. savini persisted as a paraspecies for the brown bear before perishing. The oldest fossils positively identified as from this species occur in China from about 0.5 million years ago. Brown bears entered Europe about 250,000 years ago and North Africa shortly after. Brown bear remains from the Pleistocene period are common in the British Isles, where it is thought they might have outcompeted cave bears (Ursus spelaeus). The species entered Alaska 100,000 years ago, though they did not move south until 13,000 years ago. It is speculated that brown bears were unable to migrate south until the extinction of the much larger giant short-faced bear (Arctodus simus).

Several paleontologists suggest the possibility of two separate brown bear migrations: inland brown bears, also known as grizzlies, are thought to stem from narrow-skulled bears which migrated from northern Siberia to central Alaska and the rest of the continent, while Kodiak bears descend from broad-skulled bears from Kamchatka, which colonized the Alaskan peninsula. Brown bear fossils discovered in Ontario, Ohio, Kentucky and Labrador show that the species occurred farther east than indicated in historic records. In North America, two types of the subspecies Ursus arctos horribilis are generally recognized—the coastal brown bear and the inland grizzly bear; these two types broadly define the range of sizes of all brown bear subspecies.

Scientific taxonomy

There are many methods used by scientists to define bear species and subspecies, as no one method is always effective. Brown bear taxonomy and subspecies classification has been described as "formidable and confusing," with few authorities listing the same specific set of subspecies. Genetic testing is now perhaps the most important way to scientifically define brown bear relationships and names. Generally, genetic testing uses the word clade rather than species because a genetic test alone cannot define a biological species. Most genetic studies report on how closely related the bears are (or their genetic distance). There are hundreds of obsolete brown bear subspecies, each with its own name, and this can become confusing; Hall (1981) lists 86 different types, and even as many as 90 have been proposed. However, recent DNA analysis has identified as few as five main clades which contain all extant brown bears, while a 2017 phylogenetic study revealed nine clades, including one representing polar bears. , 15 extant or recently extinct subspecies were recognized by the general scientific community.

As well as the exact number of overall brown bear subspecies, its precise relationship to the polar bear also remains in debate. The polar bear is a recent offshoot of the brown bear. The point at which the polar bear diverged from the brown bear is unclear, with estimations based on genetics and fossils ranging from 400,000 to 70,000 years ago, but most recent analysis has indicated that the polar bear split somewhere between 275,000 and 150,000 years ago. Under some definitions, the brown bear can be construed as the paraspecies for the polar bear.

DNA analysis shows that, apart from recent human-caused population fragmentation, brown bears in North America are generally part of a single interconnected population system, with the exception of the population (or subspecies) in the Kodiak Archipelago, which has probably been isolated since the end of the last Ice Age. These data demonstrate that U. a. gyas, U. a. horribilis, U. a. sitkensis and U. a. stikeenensis are not distinct or cohesive groups, and would more accurately be described as ecotypes. For example, brown bears in any particular region of the Alaska coast are more closely related to adjacent grizzly bears than to distant populations of brown bears, the morphological distinction seemingly driven by brown bears having access to a rich salmon food source, while grizzly bears live at higher elevation, or further from the coast, where plant material is the base of the diet. The history of the bears of the Alexander Archipelago is unusual in that these island populations carry polar bear DNA, presumably originating from a population of polar bears that was left behind at the end of the Pleistocene, but have since been connected with adjacent mainland populations through movement of males, to the point where their nuclear genomes are now more than 90% of brown bear ancestry.

Brown bears are apparently divided into five different clades, some of which coexist or co-occur in different regions.

Hybrids

A grizzly–polar bear hybrid (known either as a pizzly bear or a grolar bear) is a rare ursid hybrid resulting from a crossbreeding of a brown bear and a polar bear. It has occurred both in captivity and in the wild. In 2006, the occurrence of this hybrid in nature was confirmed by testing the DNA of a strange-looking bear that had been shot in the Canadian Arctic, and seven more hybrids have since been confirmed in the same region, all descended from a single female polar bear. Previously, the hybrid had been produced in zoos and was considered a "cryptid" (a hypothesized animal for which there is no scientific proof of existence in the wild).

Analyses of the genomes of bears have shown that introgression between species was widespread during the evolution of the genus Ursus, including the introgression of polar bear DNA introduced to brown bears during the Pleistocene.

A bear shot in autumn 1986 in Michigan, US, was thought by some to be a grizzly/American black bear hybrid, due to its unusually large size and its proportionately larger braincase and skull. DNA testing was unable to determine whether it was a large American black bear or a grizzly bear.

Description

The brown bear is the most variable in size of modern bears. The typical size depends upon which population it is from, and most accepted subtypes vary widely in size. This is in part due to sexual dimorphism, as male brown bears average at least 30% larger in most subtypes. Individual bears also vary in size seasonally, weighing the least in spring due to lack of foraging during hibernation, and the most in late fall, after a period of hyperphagia to put on additional weight to prepare for hibernation. Therefore, a bear may need to be weighed in both spring and fall to get an idea of its mean annual weight.

The smallest brown bears, females during spring among barren-ground populations, can weigh so little as to roughly match the body mass of males of the smallest living bear species, the sun bear (Helarctos malayanus), while the largest coastal populations attain sizes broadly similar to those of the largest living bear species, the polar bear. The average weight of adult male bears from 19 populations, from around the world and various subspecies (including both large- and small-bodied subspecies), was found to be  while adult females from 24 populations were found to average .

Color

Brown bears are often not fully brown. They have long, thick fur, with a moderately long mane at the back of the neck which varies somewhat across the types. In India, brown bears can be reddish with silver-tipped hairs, while in China brown bears are bicolored, with a yellowish-brown or whitish collar across the neck, chest and shoulders. Even within well-defined subspecies, individuals may show highly variable hues of brown. North American grizzlies can be dark brown (almost black) to cream (almost white) or yellowish-brown and often have darker-colored legs. The common name "grizzly" stems from their typical coloration, with the hairs on their back usually being brownish-black at the base and whitish-cream at the tips, giving them their distinctive "grizzled" color. Apart from the cinnamon subspecies of the American black bear (U. americanus cinnamonum), the brown bear is the only modern bear species to typically appear truly brown. The winter fur is very thick and long, especially in northern subspecies, and can reach  at the withers. The winter hairs are thin, yet rough to the touch. The summer fur is much shorter and sparser and its length and density varies geographically.

Cranial morphology and size

Adults have massive, heavily built concave skulls, which are large in proportion to the body. The forehead is high and rises steeply. The projections of the skull are well developed when compared to those of Asian black bears (Ursus thibetanus): the latter have sagittal crests not exceeding more than 19–20% of the total length of the skull, while the former have sagittal crests comprising up to 40–41% of the skull's length. Skull projections are more weakly developed in females than in males. The braincase is relatively small and elongated. There is a great deal of geographical variation in the skull, and presents itself chiefly in dimensions. Grizzlies, for example, tend to have flatter profiles than European and coastal American brown bears. Brown bears have very strong teeth: the incisors are relatively big and the canine teeth are large, the lower ones being strongly curved. The first three molars of the upper jaw are underdeveloped and single crowned with one root. The second upper molar is smaller than the others, and is usually absent in adults. It is usually lost at an early age, leaving no trace of the alveolus in the jaw. The first three molars of the lower jaw are very weak, and are often lost at an early age. The teeth of brown bears reflect their dietary plasticity and are broadly similar to other bears, excluding the two most herbivorous living bears, the giant panda (Ailuropoda melanoleuca) and the spectacled bear (Tremarctos ornatus), which have blunt, small premolars (ideal for grinding down fibrous plants) compared to the jagged premolars of ursid bears that at least seasonally often rely on flesh as a food source. The teeth are reliably larger than American black bears, but average smaller in molar length than polar bears. Brown bears have the broadest skull of any extant ursine bear; only the aforementioned most herbivorous living bears exceed them in relative breadth of the skull. Another extant ursine bear, the sloth bear (Melursus ursinus), has a proportionately longer skull than the brown bear and can match the skull length of even large brown bear subtypes, presumably as an aid for foraging heavily on insect colonies for which a long muzzle is helpful as an evolved feature in several unrelated mammalian groups.

Claws and feet

Brown bears have very large and curved claws, those present on the forelimbs being longer than those on the hind limbs. They may reach  and may measure  along the curve. They are generally dark with a light tip, with some forms having completely light claws. Brown bear claws are longer and straighter than those of American black bears (Ursus americanus). The claws are blunt, while those of a black bear are sharp. Due to their claw structure, in addition to their excessive weight, adult brown bears cannot typically climb trees as well as both species of black bear, although in rare cases adult female brown bears have been seen in trees. The claws of a polar bear are also quite different, being notably shorter but broader with a strong curve and sharper point, presumably both as an aid to traveling over ice (sometimes nearly vertically) and procuring active prey. The paws of the brown bear are quite large. Brown bears are the only extant bears with a hump at the top of their shoulder, which is made entirely of muscle, this feature having developed presumably for imparting more force in digging, which is habitual during foraging for most bears of the species and also used heavily in den construction prior to hibernation. The brown bear's strength has been roughly estimated as 2.5 to 5 times that of a human.

Distribution and habitat

Brown bears were once native to Europe, much of Asia, the Atlas Mountains of Africa, and North America, but are now extirpated in some areas, and their populations have greatly decreased in other areas. There are approximately 200,000 brown bears left in the world. The largest populations are in Russia with 120,000, the United States with 32,500, and Canada with around 25,000. Brown bears live in Alaska, east through the Yukon and Northwest Territories, south through British Columbia and through the western half of Alberta. The Alaskan population is estimated at a healthy 32,000 individuals. In the lower 48 states, they are repopulating slowly, but steadily along the Rockies and the western Great Plains.

In Europe, in 2010, there were 14,000 brown bears in ten fragmented populations, from Spain (estimated at only 20–25 animals in the Pyrenees in 2010, in a range shared between Spain, France and Andorra, and some 210 animals in Asturias, Cantabria, Galicia and León, in the Picos de Europa and adjacent areas in 2013) in the west, to Russia in the east, and from Sweden and Finland in the north to Romania (5000–6000), Bulgaria (900–1200), Slovakia (with about 600–800 animals), Slovenia (500–700 animals) and Greece (with Karamanlidis et al. 2015 estimating >450 animals) in the south.

In Asia, brown bears are found primarily throughout Russia, thence more spottily southwest to parts of the Middle East, including almost all parts of Kurdistan, to as far south as southwestern Iran, and to the southeast in Northeast China. Brown bears are also found in Western China, Kyrgyzstan, North Korea, Pakistan, Afghanistan and India. They can also be found on the Japanese island of Hokkaidō, which holds the largest number of non-Russian brown bears in eastern Asia with about 2,000–3,000 animals.

This species inhabits the broadest range of habitats of any living bear species.
In most of their range, brown bears generally seem to prefer semiopen country, with a scattering of vegetation that can allow them a resting spot during the day. However, they have been recorded as inhabiting every variety of northern temperate forest known to occur.

Conservation status

While the brown bear's range has shrunk and it has faced local extinctions, it remains listed as a Least concern species by the IUCN, with a total population of approximately 200,000. , this and the American black bear are the only bear species not classified as threatened by the IUCN. However, the California grizzly bear, Ungava brown bear, Atlas bear and Mexican grizzly bear, as well as brown bear populations in the Pacific Northwest, were hunted to extinction in the 19th and early 20th centuries and many of the southern Asian subspecies are highly endangered. The Syrian brown bear (Ursus arctos syriacus) is very rare and it has been extirpated from more than half of its historic range. One of the smallest-bodied subspecies, the Himalayan brown bear (Ursus arctos isabellinus), is critically endangered, occupying only 2% of its former range and threatened by uncontrolled poaching for its body parts. The Marsican brown bear in central Italy is believed to have a population of just 50–60 bears.

Behavior and life history

The brown bear is often described as nocturnal. However, it frequently seems to peak in activity in the morning and early evening hours. Studies have shown that activity throughout the range can occur at nearly any time of night or day, with bears who dwell in areas with more extensive human contact being more likely to be fully nocturnal. Furthermore, yearling and newly independent bears are more likely to be active diurnally and many adult bears in low-disturbance areas are largely crepuscular. Although they are not full hibernators and can be woken easily, both sexes like to den in a protected spot during the winter months. Hibernation dens may consist of any spot that provides cover from the elements and that can accommodate their bodies, such as a cave, crevice, cavernous tree roots, or hollow logs.

Brown bears have one of the largest brains of any extant carnivoran relative to their body size and have been shown to engage in tool use (e.g., using a barnacle-covered rock to scratch its neck), which requires advanced cognitive abilities. This species is mostly solitary, although bears may gather in large numbers at major food sources (e.g.,  open garbage dumps or rivers holding spawning salmon) and form social hierarchies based on age and size. Adult male bears are particularly aggressive and are avoided by adolescent and subadult males, both at concentrated feeding opportunities and chance encounters. Female bears with cubs rival adult males in aggression and are much more intolerant of other bears than single females. Young adolescent males tend to be least aggressive and have been observed in nonantagonistic interactions with each other. Dominance between bears is asserted by making a frontal orientation, showing off canines, muzzle twisting and neck stretching to which a subordinate will respond with a lateral orientation, by turning away and dropping the head and by sitting or lying down. During combat, bears use their paws to strike their opponents in the chest or shoulders and bite the head or neck.

Communication

Several different facial expressions have been documented in brown bears. The "relaxed-face" is made in everyday activities and has the ears pointed to the sides and the mouth closed or slackly open. During social play, bears makes "relaxed open-mouth face" in which the mouth is open, with a curled upper lip and hanging lower lip, and the ears alert and shifting. When looking at another animal at a distance, the bear makes an "alert face" as the ears are cocked and alert, the eyes wide open but the mouth is closed or only open slightly. The "tense closed mouth face" is made with the ears laid back and the mouth closed and occurs when the bear feels threatened. When approached by another individual, the animal makes a "puckered-lip face" with a protruding upper lip and ears which go from cocked and alert when at a certain distance to laid back when closer or when retreating. The "jaw gape face" consists of an open mouth with visible lower canines and hanging lips while the "biting face" is similar to the "relaxed open-mouth face" except the ears are flattened and the eyes are wide enough to expose the sclera. Both the "jaw gape face" and the "biting face" are made in aggression and bears switch between them.

Brown bears also produce various vocalizations. Huffing occurs when the animal is tense while woofing is made when alarmed. Both sounds are produced by exhalations though huffing is harsher and is made continuously (two per second). Growls and roars are made in aggression. Growling is harsh and guttural and can range from a simple grrr to a rumble. A rumbling growl can escalate into a roar when the bear is charging. Roaring is described as "thunderous" and can travel . Mothers and cubs wanting physical contact will bawl, which is heard as waugh!, waugh!.

Home ranges
Brown bears usually occur over vast home ranges; however, they are not highly territorial. Several adult bears often roam freely over the same vicinity without issue, unless rights to a fertile female or food sources are being contested. Males always cover more area than females each year. Despite their lack of traditional territorial behavior, adult males can seem to have a "personal zone" in which other bears are not tolerated if they are seen. Males always wander further than females, due to both increasing access to females and food sources, while females are advantaged by smaller territories in part since it decreases the likelihood of encounters with male bears who may endanger their cubs. In Romania, the largest home range was recorded for adult males (3,143 km2, 1214 sq mi).

A study of male-inherited Y chromosome DNA sequence found that brown bears, over the past few 10,000 years, have shown strong male-biased dispersal. That study found surprisingly similar Y chromosomes in brown bear populations as far apart as Norway and coastal Alaska, indicating extensive gene flow across Eurasia and North America. Notably, this contrasts with genetic signals from female-inherited mitochondrial DNA (mtDNA), where brown bears of different geographic regions typically show strong differences in their mtDNA, a result of female philopatry.

Reproduction

The mating season is from mid-May to early July, shifting later the further north the bears are found. Being serially monogamous, brown bears remain with the same mate from a couple of days to a couple of weeks. Outside of this narrow time frame, adult male and female brown bears show no sexual interest in each other. Females mature sexually between the age of four and eight years of age, with an average age at sexual maturity of 5.2–5.5 years old, while males first mate about a year later on average, when they are large and strong enough to successfully compete with other males for mating rights. Males will try to mate with as many females as they can; usually a successful one mates with two females in a span of one to three weeks. The adult female brown bear is similarly promiscuous, mating with up to four, rarely even eight, males while in heat and potentially breeding with two males in a single day. Females come into oestrus on average every three to four years, with a full range of 2.4 to 5.7 years. The urine markings of a female in oestrus can attract several males via scent. Paternity DNA tests have shown that littermates do not share the same father in up to 29% of litters. Dominant males may try to sequester a female for her entire oestrus period of approximately two weeks, but usually are unable to retain her for the entire time. Copulation is vigorous and prolonged and can last up to an hour, although the mean time is about 23–24 minutes.

Males take no part in raising their cubs – parenting is left entirely to the females. Through the process of delayed implantation, a female's fertilized egg divides and floats freely in the uterus for six months. During winter dormancy, the fetus attaches to the uterine wall. The cubs are born eight weeks later while the mother sleeps. If the mother does not gain enough weight to survive through the winter while gestating, the embryo does not implant and is reabsorbed into the body. There have been cases of brown bears with as many as six cubs, although the average litter size is one to three, with more than four being considered uncommon. There are records of females sometimes adopting stray cubs or even trading or kidnapping cubs when they emerge from hibernation (a larger female may claim cubs away from a smaller one). Older and larger females within a population tend to give birth to larger litters. The size of a litter also depends on factors such as geographic location and food supply. They feed on their mother's milk until spring or even early summer, depending on climate conditions. At this time, the cubs weigh  and have developed enough to follow her over long distances and begin to forage for solid food.

The cubs are fully dependent on the mother and a close bond is formed. During the dependency stage, the cubs learn (rather than inherit as instincts from birth) survival techniques, such as which foods have the highest nutritional value and where to obtain them; how to hunt, fish and defend themselves; and where to den. Increased brain size in large carnivores has been positively linked to whether a given species is solitary, as is the brown bear, or raises their offspring communally, thus female brown bears have relatively large, well-developed brains, presumably key in teaching behavior. The cubs learn by following and imitating their mother's actions during the period they are with her. Cubs remain with their mother for an average of 2.5 years in North America, uncommonly being independent as early as 1.5 years of age or as late as 4.5 years of age. The stage at which independence is attained may generally be earlier in some parts of Eurasia, as the latest date which mother and cubs were together was 2.3 years, most families separated in under two years in a study from Hokkaido and in Sweden most cubs on their own were still yearlings. Brown bears practice infanticide, as an adult male bear may kill the cubs of another. When an adult male brown bear kills a cub, it is usually because he is trying to bring the female into oestrus, as she will enter that state within two to four days after the death of her cubs. Cubs flee up a tree, if available, when they see a strange male bear and the mother often successfully defends them, even though the male may be twice as heavy as she, although females have been known to die in these confrontations.

Dietary habits

The brown bear is one of the most omnivorous animals in the world and has been recorded as consuming the greatest variety of foods of any bear. Throughout life, this species is regularly curious about the potential of eating virtually any organism or object that they encounter. Food that is both abundant and easily accessed or caught is preferred. Their jaw structure has evolved to fit their dietary habits. Their diet varies enormously throughout their differing areas based on opportunity.

Despite their reputation, most brown bears are not highly carnivorous, as they derive up to 90% of their dietary food energy from vegetable matter. They often feed on a variety of plant life, including berries, grasses, flowers, acorns and pine cones, as well as fungi such as mushrooms. Among all bears, brown bears are uniquely equipped to dig for tough foods such as roots, bulbs and shoots. They use their long, strong claws to dig out earth to reach the roots and their powerful jaws to bite through them. In spring, winter-provided carrion, grasses, shoots, sedges, moss and forbs are the dietary mainstays for brown bears internationally. Fruits, including berries, become increasingly important during summer and early autumn. Roots and bulbs become critical in autumn for some inland bear populations if fruit crops are poor. They will also commonly consume animal matter, which in summer and autumn may regularly be in the form of insects, larvae and grubs, including beehives. Bears in Yellowstone eat an enormous number of moths during the summer, sometimes as many as 40,000 Army cutworm moths in a single day, and may derive up to half of their annual food energy from these insects. Brown bears living near coastal regions will regularly eat crabs and clams. In Alaska, bears along the beaches of estuaries regularly dig through the sand for clams. This species may eat birds and their eggs, including almost entirely ground- or rock-nesting species. The diet may be supplemented by rodents or similar smallish mammals, including marmots, ground squirrels, mice, rats, lemmings and voles. With particular regularity, bears in Denali National Park will wait at burrows of Arctic ground squirrels hoping to pick off a few of the  rodents.

In the Kamchatka peninsula and several parts of coastal Alaska, brown bears feed mostly on spawning salmon, whose nutrition and abundance explain the enormous size of the bears in these areas. The fishing techniques of bears are well-documented. They often congregate around falls when the salmon are forced to breach the water, at which point the bears will try to catch the fish in mid-air (often with their mouths). They will also wade into shallow waters, hoping to pin a slippery salmon with their claws. While they may eat almost all the parts of the fish, bears at the peak of spawning, when there is usually a glut of fish to feed on, may eat only the most nutrious parts of the salmon (including the eggs and head) and then indifferently leave the rest of the carcass to scavengers, which can include red foxes, bald eagles, common ravens and gulls. Despite their normally solitary habits, brown bears will gather rather closely in numbers at good spawning sites. The largest and most powerful males claim the most fruitful fishing spots and bears (especially males) will sometimes fight over the rights to a prime fishing spot.

Beyond the regular predation of salmon, most brown bears are not particularly active predators. While perhaps a majority of bears of the species will charge at large prey at one point in their lives and most eat carrion, many predation attempts start with the bear clumsily and half-heartedly pursuing the prey and end with the prey escaping alive. On the other hand, some brown bears are quite self-assured predators who habitually pursue and catch large prey items. Such bears are usually taught how to hunt by their mothers from an early age. Large mammals preyed on can include various ungulate species such as elk, moose, caribou, muskoxen and wild boar. When brown bears attack these large animals, they usually target young or infirm ones, as they are easier to catch. Typically when hunting (especially with young prey), the bear pins its prey to the ground and then immediately tears and eats it alive. It will also bite or swipe some prey to stun it enough to knock it over for consumption. To pick out young or infirm individuals, bears will charge at herds so the slower-moving and more vulnerable individuals will be made apparent. Brown bears may also ambush young animals by finding them via scent. When emerging from hibernation, brown bears, whose broad paws allow them to walk over most ice and snow, may pursue large prey such as moose whose hooves cannot support them on encrusted snow. Similarly, predatory attacks on large prey sometimes occur at riverbeds, when it is more difficult for the prey specimen to run away due to muddy or slippery soil. On rare occasions, while confronting fully-grown, dangerous prey, bears kill them by hitting with their powerful forearms, which can break the necks and backs of large creatures such as adult moose and adult bison. They also feed on carrion, and use their size to intimidate other predators, such as wolves, cougars, tigers, and American black bears from their kills. Carrion is especially important in the early spring (when the bears are emerging from hibernation), much of it comprising winter-killed big game. Cannibalism is not unheard of, though predation is not normally believed to be the primary motivation when brown bears attack each other.

When forced to live in close proximity with humans and their domesticated animals, bears may potentially predate any type of domestic animal. Among these, domestic cattle are sometimes exploited as prey. Cattle are bitten on the neck, back or head and then the abdominal cavity is opened for eating. Plants and fruit farmed by humans are readily consumed as well, including corn, wheat, sorghum, melons and any form of berries. They will also feed at domestic bee yards, readily consuming both honey and the brood (grubs and pupae) of the honey bee colony. Human foods and trash or refuse is eaten when possible. When an open garbage dump was kept in Yellowstone, brown bears were one of the most voracious and regular scavengers. The dump was closed after both brown and American black bears came to associate humans with food and lost their natural fear of them.

Interspecific predatory relationships

Adult bears are generally immune to predatory attacks except from large Siberian (Amur) tigers and other bears. Following a decrease of ungulate populations from 1944 to 1959, 32 cases of Siberian tigers attacking both Ussuri brown bears (Ursus arctos lasiotus) and Ussuri black bears (U. thibetanus ussuricus) were recorded in the Russian Far East, and hair of bears were found in several tiger scat samples. Tigers attack black bears less often than brown bears, as the latter live in more open habitats and are not able to climb trees. In the same time period, four cases of brown bears killing female tigers and young cubs were reported, both in disputes over prey and in self-defense. Tigers mainly feed on the bear's fat deposits, such as the back, hams and groin.

When Amur tigers prey on brown bears, they usually target young and sub-adult bears, besides small female adults taken outside their dens, generally when lethargic from hibernation. Predation by tigers on denned brown bears was not detected during a study carried between 1993 and 2002. Ussuri brown bears, along with the smaller black bears constitute 2.1% of the Siberian tiger's annual diet, of which 1.4% are brown bears.

The effect the presence of tigers has on brown bear behavior seems to vary. In the winters of 1970–1973, Yudakov and Nikolaev recorded two cases of bears showing no fear of tigers and another case of a brown bear changing path upon crossing tiger tracks. Other researchers have observed bears following tiger tracks to scavenge tiger kills and to potentially prey on tigers. Despite the threat of predation, some brown bears actually benefit from the presence of tigers by appropriating tiger kills that the bears may not be able to successfully hunt themselves. Brown bears generally prefer to contest the much smaller female tigers. During telemetry research in the Sikhote-Alin Nature Reserve, 44 direct confrontations between bears and tigers were observed, in which bears (not just brown bears) in general were killed in 22 cases, and tigers in 12 cases. There are reports of brown bears specifically targeting Amur leopards and tigers to abstract their prey. In the Sikhote-Alin reserve, 35% of tiger kills were stolen by bears, with tigers either departing entirely or leaving part of the kill for the bear. Some studies show that bears frequently track down tigers to usurp their kills, with occasional fatal outcomes for the tiger. A report from 1973 describes twelve known cases of brown bears killing tigers, including adult males; in all cases the tigers were subsequently eaten by the bears.

Brown bears regularly intimidate wolves to drive them away from their kills. In Yellowstone National Park, bears pirate wolf kills so often, Yellowstone's Wolf Project director Doug Smith wrote, "It's not a matter of if the bears will come calling after a kill, but when." Despite the high animosity between the two species, most confrontations at kill sites or large carcasses end without bloodshed on either side. Though conflict over carcasses is common, on rare occasions, the two predators tolerate each other on the same kill. To date, there is a single case of fully-grown wolves being killed by a grizzly bear. Given the opportunity, however, both species will prey on the other's cubs. Conclusively, the individual power of the bear against the collective strength of the wolf pack usually results in a long battle for kills or domination.

In some areas, grizzly bears also regularly displace cougars from their kills. Cougars kill small bear cubs on rare occasions, but there was one report of a bear killing a cougar of unknown age and condition between 1993 and 1996. Smaller carnivorous animals, including coyotes, wolverines, lynxes, and any other sympatric carnivores or raptorial birds, are dominated by grizzly bears and generally avoid direct interactions with them, unless attempting to steal scraps of food. However, wolverines have been persistent enough to fend off a grizzly bear as much as ten times their weight off a kill. There is one record of a golden eagle preying on a brown bear cub.

Brown bears usually dominate other bear species in areas where they coexist. Due to their smaller size, American black bears are at a competitive disadvantage to grizzly bears in open, unforested areas. Although displacement of black bears by grizzly bears has been documented, actual interspecific killing of black bears by grizzlies has only occasionally been reported. Confrontation is mostly avoided due to the black bear's diurnal habits and preference for heavily forested areas, as opposed to the grizzly's largely nocturnal habits and preference for open spaces. Brown bears may also kill Asian black bears, though the latter species probably largely avoids conflicts with the brown bear, due to similar habits and habitat preferences to the American black species. They will eat the fruit dropped by the Asian black bear from trees, as they themselves are too large and cumbersome to climb.  Improbably, in the Himalayas Brown bears are reportedly intimidated by Asian black bears in confrontations.

There has been a recent increase in interactions between brown bears and polar bears, theorized to be caused by climate change. Brown and grizzly bears have been seen moving increasingly northward into territories formerly claimed by polar bears. They tend to dominate polar bears in disputes over carcasses, and dead polar bear cubs have been found in brown bear dens.

Longevity and mortality

The brown bear has a naturally long life. Wild females have been observed reproducing up to 28 years of age, which is the oldest known age for reproduction of any ursid in the wild. The peak reproductive age for females ranges from four to 20 years old. The lifespan of brown bears of both sexes within minimally hunted populations is estimated at an average of 25 years. The oldest wild brown bear on record was nearly 37 years old. The oldest recorded female in captivity was nearly 40 years old, while males in captivity have been verified to live up to 47 years, with one captive male possibly attaining 50 years of age.

While male bears potentially live longer in captivity, female grizzly bears have a greater annual survival rate than males within wild populations per a study done in the Greater Yellowstone Ecosystem. Annual mortality for bears of any age is estimated at 10% in most protected areas; however, the average annual mortality rate rises to an estimated 38% in hunted populations. Around 13% to 44% of cubs die within their first year even in well-protected areas. Mortality rates of 75–100% among the cubs of any given year are not uncommon. Beyond predation by large predators including wolves, Siberian tigers and other brown bears, starvation and accidents also claim the lives of cubs. Studies have indicated that the most prevalent source of mortality for first-year cubs is malnutrition. By the second and third years of their lives, the annual mortality rate among cubs in the care of their mothers drops to 10-15%.

Even in populations living in protected areas, humans are still the leading cause of mortality for brown bears. The largest amount of legalized brown bear hunting occurs in Canada, Finland, Russia, Slovakia and Alaska. Hunting is unregulated in many areas within the range of the brown bear. Even where hunting is legally permitted, most biologists feel that the numbers hunted are excessive considering the low reproduction rate and sparse distribution of the species. Brown bears are also killed in collisions with automobiles, which is a significant cause of mortality in the United States and Europe.

Relationship with humans

Conflicts between bears and humans

Brown bears usually avoid areas where extensive development or urbanization has occurred, unlike the smaller, more inoffensive American black bear which can adapt to peri-urban regions. Under many circumstances, extensive human development may cause brown bears to alter their home ranges. High road densities (both paved and gravel roads) are often associated with higher mortality, habitat avoidance and lower bear density. However, brown bears can easily lose their natural cautiousness upon being attracted to human-created food sources, such as garbage dumps, litter bins and dumpsters. Brown bears may even venture into human dwellings or barns in search of food as humans encroach on bear habitats. In other areas, such as Alaska, dumps may continue to be an attractant for brown bears. In different parts of their distribution, brown bears sometimes kill and eat domesticated animals. The saying "A fed bear is a dead bear" has come into use to popularize the idea that allowing a bear to scavenge human garbage, such as trash cans and campers' backpacks, pet food, or other food sources that draw the bear into contact with humans, can result in the bear's death. Results of a 2016 study performed in a southeastern British Columbian valley indicate that areas where attractive bear food and concentrated human settlements overlap, human-bear conflict can create an ecological trap resulting in a lower apparent survival rate for brown bears, as well as attracting additional bears and thereby causing overall population declines.

When brown bears come to associate human activity with a "food reward", they are likely to continue to become emboldened; the likelihood of human-bear encounters increases, as they may return to the same location despite relocation. Relocation of the bear has been used to separate the bear from the human environment, but it does not address the problem of the bear's newly learned association of humans with food or the environmental situations which created the human-habituated bear. "Placing a bear in habitat used by other bears may lead to competition and social conflict, and result in the injury or death of the less dominant bear." Yellowstone National Park, a reserve located in the western United States, contains prime habitat for the grizzly bear (Ursus arctos horribilis) and due to the enormous number of visitors, human-bear encounters are common. The scenic beauty of the area has led to an influx of people moving into the area. In addition, because there are so many bear relocations to the same remote areas of Yellowstone, and because male bears tend to dominate the center of the relocation zone, female bears tend to be pushed to the boundaries of the region and beyond. As a result, a large proportion of repeat offenders, bears that are killed for public safety, are females. This creates a further depressive effect on an already-endangered subspecies. The grizzly bear is officially described as "Threatened" in the U.S.. Although the problem is most significant with regard to grizzlies, these issues affect the other types of brown bears as well.

In Europe, part of the problem lies with shepherds; over the past two centuries, many sheep and goat herders have gradually abandoned the more traditional practice of using dogs to guard flocks, which have concurrently grown larger. Typically, they allow the herds to graze freely over sizeable tracts of land. As brown bears reclaim parts of their range, they may eat livestock as sheep and goats are relatively easy for a bear to kill. In some cases, the shepherds shoot the bear, thinking their livelihood is under threat. Many are now better informed about the ample compensation available and will make a claim when they lose livestock to a bear. Another issue in several parts of their range in Europe is supplemental feeding stations where various kind of animal carrion is offered, which are set up mainly in Scandinavia and eastern Europe both to support the locally threatened species and so humans can enjoy watching bears that may otherwise prove evasive. Despite that most stations were cautiously set in remote areas far from human habitations, some brown bears in such areas have become conditioned to associate humans with food and become excessively bold "problem bears". Also, supplemental feeding appears to cause no decrease in livestock predation.

Bear encounters and attacks

Brown bears seldom attack humans on sight and usually avoid people. In Russia, it is estimated that 1 in 1,000 on-foot encounters with brown bears results in an attack. They are, however, unpredictable in temperament, and may attack if they are surprised or feel threatened. There are an average of two fatal attacks by bears per year in North America. In Scandinavia, there are only four known cases since 1902 of bear encounters which have resulted in death. The two most common causes for bear attack are surprise and curiosity. Some types of bears, such as polar bears, are more likely to attack humans when searching for food, while American black bears are much less likely to attack. Despite their boldness and potential for predation if the bear is hungry, polar bears rarely attack humans, because they are infrequently encountered in the Arctic sea. Aggressive behavior in brown bears is favored by numerous selection variables. Increased aggressiveness also assists female brown bears in better ensuring the survival of their young to reproductive age. Mothers defending cubs are the most prone to attacking, being responsible for 70% of brown bear-caused human fatalities in North America.

Sows with cubs account for many attacks on humans by brown bears in North America. Habituated or food-conditioned bears can also be dangerous, as their long-term exposure to humans causes them to lose their natural shyness and, in some cases, to associate humans with food. Small parties of one or two people are more often attacked by brown bears than large groups, with only one known case of an attack on a group of six or more. In that instance, it is thought that due to surprise, the grizzly bear may not have recognized the size of the group. In the majority of attacks resulting in injury, brown bears precede the attack with a growl or huffing sound. In contrast to injuries caused by American black bears, which are usually minor, brown bear attacks more often tend to result in serious injury and, in some cases, death. Brown bears seem to confront humans as they would when fighting other bears: they rise up on their hind legs, and attempt to "disarm" their victims by biting and holding on to the lower jaw to avoid being bitten in turn. Due to the bears' enormous physical strength, even a single bite or swipe can be deadly as in tigers, with some human victims having had their heads completely crushed by a bear bite. Most attacks occur in the months of July, August and September, the time when the number of outdoor recreationalists, such as hikers or hunters, is higher. People who assert their presence through noises tend to be less vulnerable, as they alert bears to their presence. In direct confrontations, people who run are statistically more likely to be attacked than those who stand their ground. Violent encounters with brown bears usually last only a few minutes, though they can be prolonged if the victims fight back. In Alberta, two common behaviors by human hunters, imitating the calls of deer to attract them and carrying ungulate carcasses, seem to court aggressive behavior and lead to a higher rate of attack from grizzly bears.

Attacks on humans are considered extremely rare in the former Soviet Union, though exceptions exist in districts where they are not as often pursued by hunters. East Siberian brown bears, for example, tend to be much bolder toward humans than their shyer and more frequently hunted European counterparts. The delineation in Eurasia between areas where aggressiveness of brown bears tends to increase is the Ural Mountains, although the brown bears of eastern Europe are somewhat more aggressive than those of western Europe. In 2008, a platinum mining compound in the Olyotorsky district of northern Kamchatka was besieged by a group of 30 bears, who killed two guards and prevented workers from leaving their homes. 10 people a year on average are killed by brown bears in Russia, more than all the other parts of the brown bear's international range combined, although Russia also holds more brown bears than all other parts of the world combined. In Scandinavia, only three fatal attacks were recorded in the 20th century.

In Japan, a large brown bear nicknamed "Kesagake" (袈裟懸け, "kesa-style slasher") made history for causing the worst brown bear attack in Japanese history at Tomamae, Hokkaidō during numerous encounters during December 1915. It killed seven people and wounded three others (with possibly another three previous fatalities to its credit) before being gunned down after a large-scale beast-hunt. Today, there is still a shrine at Rokusensawa (六線沢), where the event took place in memory of the victims of the incident.

Within Yellowstone National Park, injuries caused by grizzly attacks in developed areas averaged approximately one per year during the 1930s through to the 1950s, though it increased to four per year during the 1960s. They then decreased to one injury every two years during the 1970s. Between 1980 and 2002, there have been only two human injuries caused by grizzly bears in a developed area. Although grizzly attacks were rare in the backcountry before 1970, the number of attacks increased to an average of approximately one per year during the 1970s, 1980s and 1990s. In Alberta, from 1960 to 1998, the number of attacks by grizzly bears ending in injury were nearly three times more common than attacks ending in injury by American black bears, despite the American black bear being an estimated 38 times more numerous in the province than the grizzly bear.

History of defense from bears

A study by U.S. and Canadian researchers has found bear spray to be more effective at stopping aggressive bear behavior than guns, working in 92% of studied incidents versus 67% for guns. Carrying pepper spray is highly recommended by many authorities when traveling in bear country; however, carrying two means of deterrent, one of which is a large caliber gun, is also advised. Solid shotgun slugs, or three buckshot rounds, or a pistol of .44 caliber or more is suggested if a heavy hunting rifle is not available. Guns remain a viable, last resort option to be used in defense of life from aggressive brown bears. Too often, people do not carry a proper caliber weapon to neutralize the bear. According to the Alaska Science Center, a 12-gauge shotgun with slugs has been the most effective weapon. There have been fewer injuries as a result of only carrying lethal loads in the shotgun, as opposed to deterrent rounds. State of Alaska Defense of Life or Property (DLP) laws require one to report the kill to the authorities and salvage the hide, skull and claws. A page at the State of Alaska Department of Natural Resources website offers information about how to "select a gun that will stop a bear (12-gauge shotgun or .300 mag rifle)".

Campers are often told to wear bright-colored red ribbons and bells and carry whistles to ward off bears. They are told to look for grizzly bear dung in camping areas and be careful to carry the bells and whistles in those areas. Grizzly bear dung is difficult to differentiate from American black bear dung, as diet is in a constant state of flux depending on the availability of seasonal food items. If a bear is killed near camp, the bear's carcass must be adequately disposed of, including entrails and blood, if possible. Failure to move the carcass has often resulted in it attracting other bears and further exacerbating a bad situation. Moving camps immediately is another recommended method.

Culture

Brown bears often figure into the literature of Europe and North America, in particular that which is written for children. "The Brown Bear of Norway" is a Scottish fairy tale telling the adventures of a girl who married a prince magically turned into a bear and who managed to get him back into a human form by the force of her love and after many trials and difficulties. With "Goldilocks and the Three Bears", a story from England, the Three Bears are usually depicted as brown bears. In German-speaking countries, children are often told the fairytale of "Snow White and Rose Red"; the handsome prince in this tale has been transfigured into a brown bear. In the United States, parents often read their preschool age children the book Brown Bear, Brown Bear, What Do You See? to teach them their colors and how they are associated with different animals.

The Russian bear is a common national personification for Russia (as well as the former Soviet Union), despite the country having no officially-designated national animal. The brown bear is Finland's national animal.

The grizzly bear is the state animal of Montana. The California golden bear is the state animal of California. Both animals are subspecies of the brown bear and the species was extirpated from the latter state.

The coat of arms of Madrid depicts a bear reaching up into a madroño or strawberry tree (Arbutus unedo) to eat some of its fruit, whereas the Swiss city of Bern's coat of arms also depicts a bear and the city's name is popularly thought to derive from the German word for bear. The brown bear is depicted on the reverse of the Croatian 5 kuna coin, minted since 1993.

The Bundesliga club Bayern Munich has a brown bear mascot named Berni. The Chicago National Football League (NFL) franchise is named the Bears, with no differentiation between American black and brown bears specified. The Boston National Hockey League (NHL) franchise is named the Bruins, a name for brown bears. The school mascot for Bob Jones University, Brown University, Cornell University, George Fox University, the University of Alberta, the University of California, Berkeley, the University of California, Los Angeles, the University of California, Riverside, and numerous American high schools is the brown bear.

In the town of Prats de Molló, in Vallespir, French Catalonia, a "bear festival" (festa de l'ós) is celebrated annually at the beginning of spring, in which the locals dress up as bears, cover themselves with soot or coal and oil and "attack" the onlookers, attempting to get everyone dirty. The festival ends with the ball de l'ós (bear dance).

See also
 List of fatal bear attacks in North America
 Sankebetsu brown bear incident

References

Notes

Bibliography

External links

 Brown Bear profile from National Geographic
 Bear Hunting Altered Genetics More Than Ice Age Isolation
 Ancient Fossil Offers New Clues To Brown Bears Past

 
Holarctic fauna
Extant Middle Pleistocene first appearances
Arctic land animals
Mammals of the Arctic
Bear, Brown
Mammals of North America
Mammals of Asia
Scavengers
National symbols of Finland
National symbols of Russia
Mammals described in 1758
Taxa named by Carl Linnaeus
Pleistocene bears
Fur trade